The 2023 Big 12 Conference football season will be the 28th season of the Big 12 Conference football taking place during the 2023 NCAA Division I FBS football season.

The 2023 season will be the first season for the Big 12 to have 14 members, with BYU, Cincinnati, Houston, and UCF joining the conference. It will also be the last season for founding conference members Oklahoma and Texas, which leave for the Southeastern Conference prior to the start of the 2024 season.
     
The 2023 Big 12 Championship Game will be played at AT&T Stadium in Arlington, Texas.

Head coaches

Rankings

References